Hot is an album by the rock group Half Japanese, released in 1995 by Safe House.

Critical reception

CMJ New Music Monthly gave the album a mostly positive review, praising "drummer Gilles Reider, who has no qualms about laying on the snare, and letting some speed-metal fills peek through the wall-of-punk." AllMusic called it a "nice mix between in-your-face noise and thoughtful, not too schticky indie pop."

Track listing

CD version

References 

1995 albums
Half Japanese albums
Fire Records (UK) albums